Tróndur Bogason (born 5 April 1976 as Tróndur Bogason Hansen) is a Faroese composer and musician. He composes classical works, but he also arranges music for pop, rock and folk artists. He is married to the Faroese singer Eivør Pálsdóttir with whom he also works; they arranged her album Room together. Bogason was educated at the Royal Danish Academy of Music. He has been nominated three times for the  Nordic Council Music Prize and is one of the few who have received a three-year grant from Mentanargrunnur Landsins.

Career 
He was born and grew up in the capital of the Faroe Islands, Tórshavn. In the nineties he moved to Copenhagen to study. While living in Denmark he played an active role in Faroese music amongst other Faroese musicians in Copenhagen. He was an active member of the first Faroese rap band MC-Hár, which plays rap and rock music in the Faroese language. He left the band in some periods, but came back and is still a member of the band. He is also a member of the Faroese choir in Copenhagen, Mpiri, which he and others founded in 1998.

Bogason studied at the Royal Danish Academy of Music in Copenhagen and at The Royal Conservatoire in Den Haag from 1999 to 2005. From 2005 to 2007 he continued his studies, attending the soloist program in composition at The Royal Danish Conservatory.

His music has been performed by wide selection of Faroese and international performers around the world. In recent years, he has also arranged for a number of folk/pop/rock artists including Hanus G. Johansen, Teitur Lassen, Guðrið Hansdóttir and Eivør Pálsdóttir. In 2010 he was nominated for the Nordic Council Music Prize for the third time. He has also co-worked with classical composers, musicians and ensembles, i.e. Ólavur Jakobsen, Sunleif Rasmussen and the Faroese emsemble Aldubáran.

Education 
1999-2005: The Masters program in composition at the Royal Danish Academy of Music in Copenhagen with Ib Nørholm & Hans Abrahamsen;  and at The Royal Conservatoire in Den Haag with Martijn Padding and Louis Andriessen. 
2005-2007: The Soloist program in composition at the Royal Danish Academy of Music with Bent Sørensen.

Works 
This list is not complete

Awards, nominations, funds etc. 
2006 - Won 1st prize in a competition by GHM for musical works for Symphonic Wind Band. Bogason won with his work Konstantin T. 
2006 - Nominated for the Nordic Council Music Prize for his musical work Seven Musicians for trombone and electronics
2008 - Nominated for the Nordic Council Music Prize for Investigations of a dog, based on a short story by Franz Kafka Forschungen eines Hundes
2010 - Nominated for the Nordic Council Music Prize for Butterfly, a work for piano and percussion. 
2010 - 3-years grant from the Mentanargrunnur Landsins, which is a fund under the Faroese government

Family 
Bogason is the son of Faroese writer Bergtóra Hanusardóttir and  Faroese marine biologist Bogi Hansen. He has one sister, Ragnheiður Bogadóttir, who is three years younger. Bogason married Faroese singer Eivør Pálsdóttir in 2012.

References 

21st-century classical composers
1976 births
Living people
Royal Danish Academy of Music alumni
Faroese composers
People from Tórshavn
Male classical composers
21st-century male musicians